Elgin is a rural municipality in Quebec, Canada. The population as of the Canada 2016 Census was 394. It is located southwest of Huntingdon and bounded by the Trout and Chateauguay rivers and the Canada–United States border.

History
The Municipality of the Township of Elgin was formed in 1855, with the present town hall being built in 1869. Its small fields and many stone houses attest to the first Scottish settlers who began arriving in the early 19th century.

Geography
The municipality is situated on the border with the United States, 14 kilometres south-west of Huntingdon, Quebec. It is one of the two southernmost communities in Quebec, along with Hinchinbrooke, with their tripoint with New York on the Châteauguay River being the southernmost point in the province.

Communities
The following locations reside within the municipality's boundaries:
Trout River – a hamlet situated on Route 138, just north of the U.S. border. Includes Canada & US Customs border crossing.

Lakes & rivers
The following waterways pass through or are situated within the municipality's boundaries:
Trout River – runs along the municipality's Western and Northern border.
Chateauguay River – delineates the municipality's Eastern border.

Demographics

Population

Language

Arts and culture
A rural art and music centre offers a full summer program of professional entertainment and cultural events in a renovated old church, now named Kelso Hall. Run by community volunteers Kim Moss, Nora Quinn, and Cathleen Johnston, Kelso Hall has been host to comedian Lorne Elliott, classical string quartets, silent movies with piano accompaniment, slide-music presentations, exhibits of art, and more. (Since 2013, this project has been closed)

See also
 List of municipalities in Quebec
 Jamieson Line Border Crossing

References

External links

Elgin website
Percy Covered Bridge, Powerscourt Quebec

Municipalities in Quebec
Incorporated places in Le Haut-Saint-Laurent Regional County Municipality
Canada geography articles needing translation from French Wikipedia